Castellón may refer to:

Places
 Castellón de la Plana, the capital city of the province of Castellón, in Valencian Community, Spain
 Province of Castellón, a province in Valencian Community, Spain
 Castelló, formerly Castelló de la Ribera
 Castelló d'Empúries
 Castelló de Farfanya
 Castelló de Rugat

Sports
 CD Castellón, a Spanish football team
 AB Castelló, a Spanish basketball team

People with the surname
 Julia Castelló (born 1990), Spanish swimmer
 Núria Castelló (born 1971), Spanish swimmer 
 Pedro Álvarez Castelló (1967–2004), Cuban artist 
 Blanca Castellón (born 1958), Nicaraguan poet
 Jorge Castellón (born 1969), Bolivian sprinter
 José Rizo Castellón (born 1944), Nicaraguan politician
 Facundo Hurtado Castellón (born 1950), Bolivian politician and journalist
 Federico Castellón (1914–1971), American painter and illustrator
 Francisco Castellón (1815–1855), president of "Democratic" Nicaragua during the 1854–1856 civil war
 Gabriel Castellón (born 1993), Chilean footballer 
 Francisco Javier Castellón (born 1960), Mexican politician
 Ninoska Pérez Castellón (born 1950), Cuban-American media personality
 Vladimir Castellón (born 1989), Bolivian footballer

See also 
 Castello (disambiguation)